Robert James Dopson (born August 21, 1967) is a Canadian former professional ice hockey goaltender. 

Dopson was born in Smiths Falls, Ontario. He played in the National Hockey League (NHL) for the Pittsburgh Penguins, with whom he made two appearances in the 1993-94 season.

External links

1967 births
Living people
Ayr Scottish Eagles players
Canadian ice hockey goaltenders
Cleveland Lumberjacks players
Houston Aeros (1994–2013) players
Ice hockey people from Ontario
Kansas City Blades players
Kitchener Rangers players
Lake Charles Ice Pirates players
Louisiana IceGators (ECHL) players
Louisville Icehawks players
Muskegon Lumberjacks players
Nepean Raiders players
Nippon Paper Cranes players
People from Smiths Falls
Pittsburgh Penguins players
Sheffield Steelers players
Undrafted National Hockey League players
Canadian expatriate ice hockey players in Scotland
Canadian expatriate ice hockey players in the United States
Canadian expatriate ice hockey players in Japan